Vladyslav Olehovych Horbachenko (born 11 March 1997) is a Ukrainian professional footballer who plays as a centre-forward for Ukrainian club Prykarpattia Ivano-Frankivsk.

References

External links
 Profile on Prykarpattia Ivano-Frankivsk official website
 
 

1997 births
Living people
Ukrainian footballers
Association football forwards
FC Arsenal-Kyivshchyna Bila Tserkva players
FC Vorskla Poltava players
FC Rubikon Kyiv players
FC Kalush players
FC VPK-Ahro Shevchenkivka players
FC Prykarpattia Ivano-Frankivsk (1998) players
Ukrainian First League players
Ukrainian Second League players
Sportspeople from Kyiv Oblast